Andrew Luis "Dru" Castro is a 5x Grammy Award-winning recording engineer, producer and songwriter in Atlanta, Georgia. He has produced or engineered songs for artists such as Childish Gambino, Usher, Nelly, Anitta, Pentatonix, Ciara, Keyshia Cole, T-Pain, Trina, Jamie Foxx, Nelly, Lecrae and India.Arie.  In 2009 Castro produced, engineered and wrote all the songs with India.Arie on her with the 3X Grammy (1X winning) nominated album Testimony: Vol. 2, Love & Politics.   In 2018 Castro won a Grammy as Engineer for Record of the Year on the song "This is America".  To date Dru Castro has worked on 19 Grammy nominated projects (5 have won the award) See Below.

Biography

Early years
Castro was born in Manhattan, New York and was raised in the West Palm Beach, Florida. His father and mother, who are both of Puerto Rican descent, were also born in Manhattan. From an early age Castro grew up in a musical home, where his father played piano and was the musical director of a local church. This musical influence lead Castro to start playing piano at age 5.  Castro was sent to study at Suncoast Community High School, a magnet school in Riviera Beach, Florida. While there, he was active in the Jazz, Concert and Marching bands.

Recording and Mixing
Castro moved to Atlanta in 1999, where he began engineering full-time in the booming Atlanta R&B and Hip-Hop music scene. Tricky Stewart, Bryan Michael Cox, Anthony Dent, Polow Da Don, and Sean Garrett were among the first to offer Castro a break into the recording business.  Castro has recorded, amongst others, Usher, Keyshia Cole, Ciara, T-Pain, Jamie Foxx, India.Arie, Trina, Raven-Symoné, Joe, Kelly Rowland, Stacie Orrico, and Keri Hilson. Castro has also worked on 12 Grammy nominated albums (4 have won the award) See Below.

Music House Studios
From 2006-2013, Castro owned and operated Music House Studios with fellow engineer and friend Alec Newell. The opening of "The Music House" was the fulfillment of a lifelong dream. Many artists including Usher, Ciara, Brandi, India.Arie, Keyshia cole, Yo Gotti, Lacrea, Rico Love, New Kids on the Block and Nelly had worked at the state of the art recording facility in North Atlanta.

Production
Beginning production work in 2003, his first major release as a producer came in June 2006 on the US #1 Debut Album Testimony: Vol. 1, Life & Relationship for India.Arie. He produced and co-wrote the upbeat "I Choose" and a more reflective "This Too Shall Pass". This was followed in July 2008 with the production of the single entitled "Radio" on Musiq Soulchild's fifth album release "On my Radio".  In February 2009 India.Arie's Testimony: Vol. 2, Love & Politics was released. Castro produced and recorded 12 songs with India.Arie, including the singles "Chocolate High" and "Therapy". Castro continues to produce and record in Atlanta.

Selected Discography

Singles Recorded/Mixed by Dru Castro

Singles Produced by Dru Castro

Grammys

References

1976 births
Living people
Songwriters from New York (state)
People from Manhattan
Musicians from Atlanta
Songwriters from Georgia (U.S. state)